Heminger Travel Lodge is a historic hotel located on the Lincoln Highway at Plymouth, Marshall County, Indiana.  It was built in 1937, and is a two-story, Colonial Revival style brown brick building with a red clay tile gable roof.  Attached to the building is a one-story "sun porch" with a hipped roof.

It was listed on the National Register of Historic Places in 2000.

References

Hotel buildings on the National Register of Historic Places in Indiana
Colonial Revival architecture in Indiana
Hotel buildings completed in 1937
Buildings and structures in Marshall County, Indiana
National Register of Historic Places in Marshall County, Indiana